NickMom was an American nighttime programming block owned by Viacom Media Networks (now Paramount Media Networks). It aired on the Nick Jr. channel during the later hours of 10:00 p.m. to 2:00 a.m. ET, when the channel's regular audience of children would normally be sleeping. The block carried ad-supported comedy programming targeting an adult demographic, particularly young mothers.

When NickMom was first announced in 2011, over 30 projects were in development for the block. Original shows produced for NickMom included the stand-up comedy show called NickMom Night Out, the variety show Parental Discretion with Stefanie Wilder-Taylor, and the docu-comedy show Take Me to Your Mother. The block's highest-rated program was Instant Mom, which was ordered specifically for NickMom but also aired on Nickelodeon's main channel during the Nick at Nite block.

At first, the timing of NickMom generated some controversy. As Nick Jr. only operated a single feed out of the Eastern Time Zone, the channel transitioned into its adult-oriented shows earlier than expected in other time zones. Viacom rectified this issue in February 2013 with the launch of a second Pacific Time Zone-based feed for the channel. The NickMom block lasted for almost three years, ending its run on September 28, 2015. The NickMom website was also closed, and the domain now redirects to the parental resources section of Nick.com.

History

Launch
On October 18, 2011, Viacom announced that it would launch a new block on Nick Jr. for the 2012-13 television season known as NickMom, which would be aimed towards young mothers, as part of the company's "cradle-to-grave" strategy where viewers grow into watching other Viacom networks (from Nick Jr. to Nickelodeon, then MTV, VH1 and then TV Land and formerly, CBS and Showtime). The company explained that "today's moms who grew up with Nickelodeon have a renewed relationship with us through their kids", and that the new brand would "offer a destination that is unique in today's entertainment landscape with content that taps into Nickelodeon's comedic DNA". Unlike Nick Jr.'s main programming, which was commercial-free at the time, NickMom was to be commercially supported, having recently reached sponsorship deals with General Mills and Reckitt Benckiser. Over 30 projects were in development for the block at the time of the announcement.

Closure
On September 5, 2015, the network's Twitter and Facebook accounts released a statement explaining that the NickMom programming block and website would cease operations by the end of the month.

NickMom ended its three-year run at 2 a.m. ET on September 28 after a showing of the film Guarding Tess, without any mention of it coming to an end. Shortly after, the network's website address was redirected to Nickelodeon's site for parental resources.

Programming

Original programming which launched with the block included Parental Discretion with Stefanie Wilder-Taylor, MFF: Mom Friends Forever, NickMom Night Out, and What Was Carol Brady Thinking?, featuring comedic commentary from Carol Brady within episodes of The Brady Bunch in the style of Pop-Up Video (Florence Henderson herself had no involvement in What Was Carol Brady Thinking?, with commentary penned by writers not involved with the original series).

By June 2013, some of the programs and movies airing on the block had been replaced with syndicated shows already airing on Nick at Nite (or with their rights dormant on that channel), such as The New Adventures of Old Christine and Yes, Dear. Not including Instant Mom (whose second season aired on Nickelodeon and NickMom, but moved to TV Land for its third), the majority of the block's original shows were canceled due to low ratings or creative differences.

In 2015, Movie feature presentations were added to the schedule, with family-friendly and romantic comedies becoming prevalent. After acquiring its syndication rights, NickMom began airing the 2010 iteration of the NBC family drama, Parenthood, in April 2015 (rights for that show transferred to Up after NickMom's demise as a complement to Gilmore Girls being carried by that network recently and featuring Lauren Graham as a star in both series).

Controversy
The block's timing was met with some controversy. Since Nick Jr. operated on only one feed that broadcast on a default Eastern Time Zone schedule, NickMom programming started at earlier times for viewers in different time zones. Some parents found this scheduling inappropriate, given the block's adult-oriented humor. The single-feed problem was rectified in mid-February 2013, when a second Pacific Time Zone-based feed for the Nick Jr. channel was put into service.

Ratings
Nielsen ratings for the NickMom block's first week dropped 75% from that same period the year prior when Nick Jr. and Noggin programs aired in the timeslot, with some shows registering a "scratch" as being unrated due to a low sample size. A 2013 report from SNL Kagan and distributed by the Parents Television Council, which was opposed to the block, reported Nick Jr. as a network had a large loss of half their viewers in primetime, and of advertisers during the time the most racy of NickMom content was available before the addition of Nick at Nite content, along with a surge in the ratings of competitors Disney Junior and Sprout, which continued to air preschool-targeted programming in primetime. The report noted the ratings were among the lowest in primetime for cable networks. Although the report also listed that the network had a cash flow of -27%, Nick Jr. ran traditional advertising only during the NickMom block and sustained advertising for the rest of the broadcast day, and mainly was a loss leader as part of Nickelodeon's portion of the Viacom digital cable network suite; those networks usually make little money for the company and feature little to no advertising.

References

Nickelodeon
Television programming blocks in the United States
Television networks in the United States